North Kerry was a parliamentary constituency in Ireland, which returned one Member of Parliament (MP) to the House of Commons of the Parliament of the United Kingdom, elected on a system of first-past-the-post, from 1885 to 1922.

Representation at Westminster in this constituency ceased at the 1922 United Kingdom general election, which took place on 15 November, shortly before the establishment of the Irish Free State on 6 December 1922.

Boundaries
This constituency comprised the northern part of County Kerry.

1885–1922: The baronies of Clanmaurice and Iraghticonnor.

Members of Parliament

Elections

Elections in the 1880s

Elections in the 1890s

Elections in the 1900s

Elections in the 1910s

References

Westminster constituencies in County Kerry (historic)
Dáil constituencies in the Republic of Ireland (historic)
Constituencies of the Parliament of the United Kingdom established in 1885
Constituencies of the Parliament of the United Kingdom disestablished in 1922